Taos County is a county in the U.S. state of New Mexico. As of the 2020 census, the population was 34,489. Its county seat is Taos. The county was formed in 1852 as one of the original nine counties in New Mexico Territory.

Taos County comprises the Taos, New Mexico Micropolitan Statistical Area.

Geography

This is also the highest natural point in New Mexico. Taos County contains 17 of New Mexico's highest 25 peaks.

Adjacent counties
 Rio Arriba County - west
 Mora County - southeast
 Colfax County - east
 Costilla County, Colorado - north
 Conejos County, Colorado - northwest

National protected area
 Carson National Forest (part)
 Rio Grande del Norte National Monument

Demographics

2000 census
As of the 2000 census, there were 29,979 people, 12,675 households, and 7,757 families living in the county. The racial makeup of the county was 63.77% White, 0.35% Black or African American, 6.59% Native American, 0.38% Asian, 0.12% Pacific Islander, 24.84% from other races, and 3.95% from two or more races. Hispanic or Latino of any race were 57.94% of the population.

There were 12,675 households, out of which 29.90% had children under the age of 18 living with them, 42.70% were married couples living together, 12.70% had a female householder with no husband present, and 38.80% were non-families. 32.10% of all households were made up of individuals, and 8.90% had someone living alone who was 65 years of age or older. The average household size was 2.34 and the average family size was 2.98.

In the county, the population was spread out, with 24.50% under the age of 18, 6.90% from 18 to 24, 27.40% from 25 to 44, 28.80% from 45 to 64, and 12.30% who were 65 years of age or older. The median age was 40 years. For every 100 females there were 96.20 males. For every 100 females age 18 and over, there were 93.70 males.

The median income for a household in the county was $26,762, and the median income for a family was $33,995. Males had a median income of $27,310 versus $21,121 for females. The per capita income for the county was $16,103. About 16.10% of families and 20.90% of the population were below the poverty line, including 24.60% of those under age 18 and 20.80% of those age 65 or over.

2010 census
As of the 2010 census, there were 32,937 people, 14,806 households, and 8,437 families living in the county. The racial makeup of the county was 68.7% white, 6.2% American Indian, 0.7% Asian, 0.4% black or African American, 19.1% from other races, and 4.9% from two or more races. Those of Hispanic or Latino origin made up 55.8% of the population. In terms of ancestry, 10.8% were English, 10.3% were German, 9.0% were Irish, and 1.2% were American.

Of the 14,806 households, 26.2% had children under the age of 18 living with them, 38.3% were married couples living together, 12.6% had a female householder with no husband present, 43.0% were non-families, and 36.0% of all households were made up of individuals. The average household size was 2.19 and the average family size was 2.85. The median age was 45.2 years.

The median income for a household in the county was $35,441 and the median income for a family was $43,236. Males had a median income of $34,245 versus $28,325 for females. The per capita income for the county was $22,145. About 14.5% of families and 17.0% of the population were below the poverty line, including 28.3% of those under age 18 and 11.9% of those age 65 or over.

Communities

Towns
 Red River
 Taos (county seat)

Villages
 Questa
 Taos Ski Valley

Census-designated places

 Arroyo Hondo
 Arroyo Seco
 Chamisal
 Costilla
 Ojo Caliente (part)
 Peñasco
 Picuris Pueblo
 Ranchos de Taos
 Rio Lucio
 San Cristobal
 Talpa
 Taos Pueblo
 Vadito

Other communities

 Amalia
 Cañoncito
 Carson
 Cerro
 El Prado
 El Rito
 Las Trampas
 Llano
 Llano Quemado
 No Agua
 Pilar
 Tres Piedras
 Valdez

Politics
Taos County is heavily Democratic; the last Republican candidate to win the county was Richard Nixon in 1972 by just over 2%.

Education
School districts for the county include:
 Mesa Vista Consolidated Schools
 Peñasco Independent Schools
 Questa Independent Schools
 Taos Municipal Schools

In popular culture

The Rio Grande Gorge Bridge is featured in the 1994 crime-drama film Natural Born Killers, in the 2007 comedy Wild Hogs, and in the 2009 film Terminator: Salvation.

The 2007 film Garbage Warrior documents architect Mike Reynolds who builds Earthships in and around Taos County.

See also
 National Register of Historic Places listings in Taos County, New Mexico

References

External links

 
 TaosCounty.net

 
1852 establishments in New Mexico Territory
Populated places established in 1852
Hispanic and Latino American culture in New Mexico